This list of mountains in Hungary  is actually a series of sortable tables of major mountain peaks of Hungary. The summit of a mountain or hill may be measured or sorted in several ways.
The topographic elevation of a summit measures the height of the summit above a geodetic sea level.  The first table below ranks the 10 highest major summits of Hungary by elevation with a prominence of 5 m or more. The second table is the same, just with a prominence of 100 m or more.
The topographic prominence of a summit is a measure of how high the summit rises above its surroundings. The third table below ranks the 20 most prominent summits of Hungary.
The highest summit of a given area. It could be an administrative region (e.g. county as it is in fourth table) or a mountain range as it is in fifth table.
The topographic isolation (or radius of dominance) of a summit measures how far the summit lies from its nearest point of equal elevation.

Mountains by elevation

Mountains by elevation (with a prominence of 5 m or more)

Mountains with a prominence of 100 m or more

Mountains by prominence

Highest mountain of each county and Budapest

Location

Lists of mountain ranges in Hungary

List of the most isolated summits of Hungary

References

Hungary
 
 
Geography of Hungary
Hungary
Mountains